Gündoğan, historically Turbessel (or ; ;  or ), is a village in the Oğuzeli District, Gaziantep Province, Turkey. It was originally a fortress that played an important role in the Crusades, remnant of which is a tumulus.

The village is inhabited by Turkicized Arabs from the Damalha and Albusultan tribes and Abdals of the Maya Sekenler tribe.

History

Bronze Age
The site was occupied at the beginning of the 3rd millennium BC through the end of the 17th century BC, after which it was abandoned.  It was located 50 km west of Carchemish.

Early Bronze
By 2600 BC (EBIIIA) the site was about 56 hectares. It had burials showing the emergence of an elite class.

By 2450 BC (EBIIIB) it was a planned city.

First Intermediate Period
In the EBIV, the city saw heavy destruction, but it was never abandoned.

Middle Bronze
In the MBI, the city was rebuilt in a smaller scale.

In the MBII, the city saw major construction work.

Byzantine Period
While the site had been occupied since the Bronze Age, the fort gained importance during the Byzantine Empire and came under control of local Armenian lords in the late 11th century.

Crusader era

In 1097, during the First Crusade, Baldwin I took the fortresses of Ravendel and Turbessel, which he left as fiefs to the Armenian companions who had guided him. He then was called to Edessa by the Armenian Thoros who was threatened by the Seljuks. Baldwin responded to that call and had himself adopted as successor to Thoros, in which he became Count of Edessa in 1098.

In 1100, when Godfrey of Bouillon died, Baldwin entrusted the county of Edessa to his cousin Baldwin II, then Joscelin I joined him there in 1101, and was entrusted with the county of Edessa. In late September 1108, near Turbessel, Tancred, with 1,500 Frankish knights and infantry, and 600 Turkish horsemen sent by Fakhr al-Mulk Ridwan confronted Baldwin II and the 2,000 men of Jawali Saqawa, atabeg of Mosul. Tancred and Ridwan routed Jawali's men who took refuge in Turbessel. Later on, Tancred who had initially refused to abandon Turbessel to Baldwin II, decided at the assembly in Château Pèlerin in April 1109, to give up Turbessel in return for his restoration to his old domains in the Kingdom of Jerusalem.

From 1110, Mawdud, atabeg of Mosul, resumed the offensive against the Franks and attacked the county of Edessa. Mawdûd successively besieged Edessa then Turbessel, but had to lift the siege each time, as Joscelin I succeeded in attacking the rearguard of the Turkish army. In July 1111, Mawdud launched a new invasion against the county and laid siege to Turbessel. While Mawdud was besieging Turbessel, Sultan, the Munquidite emir (or ruler) of Shaizar, sent envoys to him, seeking his assistance against Tancred. Mawdud lifted the siege of Turbessel and moved to help Shaizar.

Mawdud's invasions devastated the eastern regions of the county, but Joscelin's fief at Turbessel still flourished. In 1113, Baldwin persuaded Joscelin to come to Edessa, saying that he was dying and wanted to make his last will. Stating that Joscelin had not sent enough food to Edessa, Baldwin had him imprisoned and only released him after Joscelin renounced Turbessel.

Following the fall of Edessa in 1144, Joscelin II fled to Turbessel, where he held the remnants of the county west of the Euphrates. In 1150, Nur ad-Din defeated Joscelin II, after allying with the Seljuk Sultan of Rüm, Mas'ud. Then he tried to besiege Turbessel, but the arrival of Baldwin III forced him to lift the siege. Count Joscelin II was captured shortly after, on May 4, 1150 on his way to Antioch, and Turbessel was again besieged, but fiercely defended by Countess Beatrice of Saone. Eventually, finding her limits in defending the citadel and with the king's consent, she ceded what remains of the county to the Byzantines, but the latter proved unable to defend the city and Hanas, a lieutenant of Nur ad-Din, occupied it on July 12, 1151.

References

Sources

 
 
 
 
 
 
 

County of Edessa
History of Gaziantep Province
Forts in Turkey
Byzantine fortifications in Turkey
Ruined castles in Turkey
Villages in Oğuzeli District